Leptoceryx is a genus of moths in the subfamily Arctiinae.

Species
 Leptoceryx caudatula Kiriakoff, 1953
 Leptoceryx pusilla Kiriakoff, 1953

References

External links
Natural History Museum Lepidoptera generic names catalog

Arctiinae